The 2019 London Senior Football Championship was the 116th edition of London GAA's premier gaelic football tournament for senior clubs in London. The tournament consists of 8 teams, with the winner going on to represent London in the Connacht Senior Club Football Championship. The championship starts with a group stage and then progresses to a knock out stage.

Tír Chonaill Gaels were the defending champions after they defeated Fulham Irish in the previous years final after a replay.    

Neasden Gaels made the straight bounce back to the senior grade after just one seasons in the Intermediate grade by winning the 2018 London I.F.C. after a 2-13 to 0-13 final victory over St. Joseph's. This was their third I.F.C. triumph overall and their first since 2016. 

On 20 October 2019 Tír Chonaill Gaels claimed their 19th S.F.C. crown and second in a row when defeating Fulham Irish in the final by 1-11 to 1-10 at McGovern Park for the second year running. 

Parnells were relegated to the 2020 I.F.C. after conceding two walk-overs in the group stages and were subsequently eliminated.

Team changes 
  

The following teams have changed division since the 2018 championship season.

To S.F.C. 
Promoted from 2018 London I.F.C.
 Neasden Gaels – (Intermediate Champions)

From S.F.C. 
Relegated to 2019 London I.F.C.
 Cú Chulainns

Group stage 
All 12 teams enter the competition at this stage. The top 4 teams in both groups proceed to the quarter-finals. The 5th and 6th placed teams in each group will enter a Relegation Playoff.

Group A 

Round 1:
 Tír Chonaill Gaels 3-14, 0-7 North London Shamrocks, 7/9/2019,
 Neasden Gaels w/o, scr Parnells, 7/9/2019,

Round 2:
 North London Shamrocks 1-11, 0-10 Parnells, 15/9/2019,
 Neasden Gaels 3-11, 2-14 Tír Chonaill Gaels, 15/9/2019,

Round 3:
 Tír Chonaill Gaels w/o, scr Parnells, 22/9/2019,
 Neasden Gaels w/o, scr North London Shamrocks, 22/9/2019,

Group B 

Round 1:
 Fulham Irish 1-16, 3-4 Round Towers, 7/9/2019,
 St. Kiernan's 0-13, 1-2 Kingdom Kerry Gaels, 7/9/2019,

Round 2:
 Round Towers 8-10, 0-6 Kingdom Kerry Gaels, 15/9/2019,
 Fulham Irish 2-10, 1-12 St. Kiernan's, 15/9/2019,

Round 3:
 Fulham Irish w/o, scr Kingdom Kerry Gaels, 22/9/2019,
 St. Kiernan's 0-10, 0-8 Round Towers, 22/9/2019,

Relegation Final 
Teams who finish in 6th place in Group A and B will play in the Relegation Finals. The defeated finalist will be relegated to the 2020 I.F.C.

 Kingdom Kerry Gaels w/o, scr Parnells, 

Due to the fact that Parnells conceded walk-overs for two fixtures during the group stage, they were automatically eliminated from the competition and were relegated.

Knock-Out Stage

Semi-finals 
 Tír Chonaill Gaels 1-11, 0-5 St. Kiernan's, McGovern Park, 6/10/2019,
 Fulham Irish 3-11, 1-11 Neasden Gaels, McGovern Park, 6/10/2019,

Final

Connacht Senior Club Football Championship

References 

London Senior Football Championship
London Senior Football Championship